The House von der Decken is the name of an old Hanoverian family of German nobility. Since more than 750 years the center of the family is in a part of Lower Saxony at the south bank of the river Elbe called Kehdingen.

History

The Origin of the Family 
The first documented members of the family are Alverik and Herewart von Decca. The genealogy of the family can be traced back to Nicolaus de Deken. He was a squire and lived from about 1290 to 1360. The first von der Deckens lived near Freiburg, Lower Saxony, at the southern bank of the Elbe river.

Five Lines of the Family 
He was a mayor of Stade and had eight children. Five of his sons started the different lines of the family (see ).

The von der Deckens in South Africa 
Adolphus (1834–1886) is a son of Adolph Melchior (1806–1862). They are descendants of the Oerichsheil line. For Adolph Melchior and Adolphus see Extract of genealogical table of the family von der Decken 1. Line in German language. Adolphus emigrated 1855 first to England and later to South Africa. He settled near King Williams Town. Adolphus married in 1855 Emma Louisa Eustace, when he was 21 and she was 19 years old.  There are many descendants of Adolphus and Emma living in South Africa. Some of them with the name von der Decken live in King William's Town, in Fort Beaufort and near to Durban.

Coat of arms 
The coat of arms shows a fireplace trammel hook. On the helmet with black and silver covers is standing a natural short oak branch with hanging green leaves on both sides.

Historic coat of arms

Notable family members 
  (died 1541) councillor and mayor of the town of Stade. He was a principal supporter of Bremen's Prince-Archbishop John III.
  (born 1742 in Ritterhausen near Balje, died 1826 in Hanover), Hanoverian minister.
 Count Johann Friedrich von der Decken (born 1769 in Langwedel, died 1840 in Ringelheim), Hanoverian Generalfeldzeugmeister.
 Karl Klaus von der Decken (born 1833 in Kotzen, died 1865 in Bardera in Somalia), Explorer in East Africa, especially at the Kilimanjaro and at the Jubba River.
 Count Georg von der Decken from Ringelheim (born 1836 in Brunswick, died 1898 in Ringelheim), Member of Reichstag of the Deutsch-Hannoversche Partei. Grandson of Johann Friedrich von der Decken.
 John Decker (born 1895 in Berlin, died 1947 in Los Angeles), was born with the name Leopold von der Decken or Leopold Avenarius. He was a painter, sculptor and caricaturist in London, New York City and Los Angeles. Grandson of Count Georg von der Decken.

Bibliography in German language 

 Luneberg Mushard, Monumenta Nobilitatis Antiqvæ Familiarum Illustrium, Inprimis Ordinis Equestris in Ducatibus Bremensi & Verdensi, i. e. Denckmahl Der Uhralten/ berühmten Hochadelichen Geschlechter/ Insonderheit Der Hochlöblichen Ritterschafft Im Hertzogthum Bremen und Verden (Monuments of the ancient and famous noble families, especially of the Knighthood in the Duchy of Bremen-Verden), Bremen: Brauer, 1708, pp. 192–201.
 Elias Friedrich Schmersahl, „Nachricht von dem alten ritterbürtigen Geschlechte der Herren von der Decken im Lande Kehdingen“ (a report on the von der Decken family), in: Hamburgisches Magazin, vol. 9 (1752), pp. 619–629. 
 Wilhelm von der Decken (1807–1866) Secretary of the Kingdom of Hanover, Die Familie von der Decken in ihren verschiedenen Verhältnissen dargestellt (history of the family von der Decken), Hanover: Klindworth's Hof-Druckerei, 1865.
 Blätter der Familie von der Decken (i.e. annual family news), 1919–....
 
 Genealogisches Handbuch des Adels, Adelslexikon volume 56, 1974 and endorsements in volume 144, 2008
 Ernst Heinrich Kneschke, Neues allgemeines deutsches Adels-Lexicon (encyclopedia on nobility), 1860, p. 433. Article on Decken and Decken-Offen
 Johann Siebmacher, Siebmachers Wappenbuch (Book on coat of arms in Germany, Austria and Switzerland), 1605 in WIKIMEDIA COMMONS: Ritterschaft und Adel in Brauschweig there on p. 181 "V. DER TECKE" is the misspelled writing of "V. DER DECKEN"
 Brümmel, v. Gruben, v. Marschalck: Die Güter der Ritterschaft im Herzogtum Bremen (estates in the Duchy of Bremen), Stade: Ritterschaft der Herzogtümer Bremen und Verden, 2001

References

External links 

List of Lower Saxonies noble families
Schlossarchiv Wildenfels: The family von der Decken in the books like Almanach de Gotha
Database Persons of Lower Saxony There are 33 members of the family. Search in the database with the Name: Decken.

See also 
 
 List of German noble families starting with the letter D

Decken
Decken
Decken